Gina Lucia is an American art director, artist, designer, and educator. She has been published in the U.S., Brazil and Spain and has exhibited her work in galleries in New York City and in Jersey City, New Jersey.

Biography
Lucia earned a Bachelor of Arts degree in Studio Arts from Montclair State University and a graduate degree in Communication Design from the Pratt Institute. She is a freelance art director, and has taught Graphic Design I and II at Montclair State University, and at the NYU School of Continuing and Professional Studies. She has been published in the U.S., Brazil and Barcelona, Spain and has exhibited her work in such galleries as the PPOW Gallery in New York City, Broadway Gallery in New York City, A.I.R Gallery and Interstate Gallery in Brooklyn and The Mary Benson Gallery in Jersey City, New Jersey. Her work was published in 2008 by Rockport Publishers in a book entitled "1,000 Music Graphics." Lucia is a member of the northern New Jersey artist collective LaOla. 

Lucia has received numerous awards and accolades from Graphic Design USA, The Art Director's Club of New Jersey and NJIABC. In 2010 she was a contributing artist to the “Global Inheritance Recycling Project” at the Coachella Valley Music and Arts Festival in Indio, CA and exhibited her art in the Trashed group art exhibit at the POVevolving Gallery in Los Angeles.
Lucia was awarded a scholarship for graduate studies at the Pratt Institute in 2010.

Artistic style

Lucia's mixed media collage work fuses commercial and fine art. Hand drawn sketches are combined with found objects, photography, hand-rendered typography and presented in a thought-provoking photomontage. Inspired by music, Surrealism and the Freudian concept of free association, personal experiences and heartbreak, everyday encounters with objects people and places, the current social and political climate, her montages are spontaneous juxtapositions of unlikely things. She incorporates elements of pop culture; viscera, fashion; graffiti; low brow art; hot rod, skate, street and snowboard culture; and eclectic ephemera into her work. The harmonious commingling of both digital technology and fine art techniques has allowed her to redefine and refine her art.

Publications

 NY Arts Magazine, New York, NY 2011
 p. 146, Basic Identity,Index Book 2010, Barcelona, Spain
 p. 142 Graphic Design USA American Graphic Design Award and Publication in 2010 Design Annual, 2010
 p. 0448, 0449 pp. 124, Rockport Publishers/1,000 Music Graphics, 2008
 p. 12, The Black Book/RAW, 2008
 www.zupi.com.br, Zupi, https://web.archive.org/web/20120224182315/http://www.zupi.com.br/publique/cgi/cgilua.exe/sys/start.htm?infoid=1912&sid=13&tpl=view_cap_full.htm&from_info_index=301 Zupi Revista, Brazil 2006
 pp. 80 & 98, Graphic Design USA/2005 Inhouse Design Awards, 2005

References

External links 
 http://www.rockpub.com/categories/515/Design.html?num_per_page=20&category_id=515
 http://www.1000musicgraphics.com/
 http://www.scps.nyu.edu/faculty/ddaf/l/0/12928/gina-lucia
 https://web.archive.org/web/20110706155253/http://www.zupi.com.br/index.php/site_zupi/view/gina_lucia/
 https://web.archive.org/web/20101227192426/http://globalinheritance.org/programs/read/5/art-of-recycling
 http://www.artslant.com/la/events/show/101865-trashed-coachella
 http://www.houseofgrfx.com/
 http://www.coroflot.com/public/individual_details.asp?individual_id=302818
 http://www.creativehotlist.com/index.asp?linktarget=fullProfile.asp&indID=102935
 https://web.archive.org/web/20110102163712/http://www.montclair.edu/profilepages/view_profile.php?username=luciag
 https://web.archive.org/web/20101101114514/http://www.gdusa.com/issue_2010/09_sep/winner/index.php

Living people
Year of birth missing (living people)
American women artists
Montclair State University alumni
Montclair State University faculty
Pratt Institute alumni
American women academics
21st-century American women